Dorćol Spiders Rugby League Club is a Serbian rugby league club based in Belgrade and competing in the Serbian Rugby League.

History
Rugby club Dorćol is the oldest rugby league club in the modern history of this game in Serbia. It was founded on May 24, 1998, in the local Romansa tavern on Dorćol in Dobračina Street.The founding assembly was attended by 23 members, who unanimously elected Dragan Pavlović as the first president.

Honours
 Serbian Rugby League Championship
 Winners (14): 2002,2003,2004,2005,2006,2007, 2008,2009, 2010, 2011, 2012, 2014, 2015, 2016
 Serbian Rugby League Cup
 Winners (11): 2001,2002, 2003, 2008, 2009, 2010, 2011, 2012, 2013, 2014, 2015
 Serbian Supercup
 Winners (2): 2014,2017

Links

References

Serbian rugby league teams